Razaviyeh is a city in Razaviyeh District, Mashhad County, Razavi Khorasan province, Iran. At the 2006 census, its population was 2,785, in 697 families.

References 

Populated places in Mashhad County
Cities in Razavi Khorasan Province